Songs from My Heart.... is a studio album by American country singer-songwriter Loretta Lynn. It was released on February 15, 1965 via Decca Records and was produced by Owen Bradley. It was Lynn's third studio album released in her career and contained a total of 12 tracks. The album charted on the Billboard albums chart following its release and contained one single. The song, "Happy Birthday" became a major hit on the Billboard country chart in 1965.

Background and content
By 1965, Loretta Lynn had issued three albums at Decca Records and had several major hits at the label. Lynn's hits up to this point included "Success," "Before I'm Over You" and "Wine, Women and Song." Under the production of Owen Bradley, Lynn's early musical style incorporated the Nashville Sound and elements of traditional country music. These styles were seen on Songs from My Heart.... The album was recorded at the Columbia Studio, which was located in Nashville, Tennessee. The sessions took place in October 1964 and were all produced by Bradley.

Songs from My Heart... contained 12 tracks. Two of the album's recordings were composed by Lynn herself: "When Lonely Hits Your Heart" and "It Just Looks That Way". Another track entitled "You Made What I Am" was composed by her husband, Oliver Lynn. Additional tracks were written by other songwriters and some of the featured tracks were covers of previously-recorded songs. Covers included "Once a Day," which was a number one country hit for Connie Smith. Additionally, a cover of Roger Miller's "Half a Mind" and Don Gibson's "Oh, Lonesome Me" is also featured on the album.

Release and reception

Songs from My Heart was released on February 15, 1964 on Decca Records, becoming Lynn's third studio album release. The album was issued as a vinyl LP record, containing six songs on each side. It was Lynn's third studio effort to reach the Billboard Top Country Albums, where it peaked at number eight. It was also Lynn's second album to chart in the country top ten. The album was rated positively by Allmusic, who gave it three out of five stars. Billboard magazine, also gave it a positive review and commented on Lynn's significance to the country genre: "one of country music's finest artists, Loretta Lynn captures the true meaning of all country music, with warm deep feeling renditions..." The album contained a single which became a major hit following the album's release: "Happy Birthday." It was released as a single in November 1964. The song reached number three on the Billboard Hot Country Singles chart in early 1965.

Track listing

Personnel
All credits are adapted from the liner notes of Songs from My Heart....

Musical personnel
 Harold Bradley – electric bass guitar, electric guitar
 Floyd Cramer – piano
 Buddy Harman – drums
 Don Helms – steel guitar
 Junior Huskey – bass
 The Jordanaires – backing vocals
 Jerry Kennedy – guitar
 Loretta Lynn – lead vocals
 Grady Martin – electric guitar
 Bob Moore – bass
 Harold Morrison – guitar
 Wayne Moss – guitar
 Pete Wade – guitar

Technical personnel
 Owen Bradley – producer
 Hal Buksbaum – photography

Chart performance

Release history

References

1965 albums
Loretta Lynn albums
Albums produced by Owen Bradley
Decca Records albums